is a Japanese composer, arranger and music producer. She has provided the music for several popular anime series, such as Sword Art Online, Puella Magi Madoka Magica, Fate/Zero, The Garden of Sinners and Pandora Hearts.

As a composer, Kajiura is known for her unique and distinctive musical motifs and leitmotifs, as well as for her distinctive fusion of contemporary classical music and electronic music.

Biography
Kajiura was born on August 6, 1965, in Tokyo, Japan. She has been into music since 1972 and accompanying her father on the piano. Her family later moved to West Germany because of her father's work. Kajiura wrote her first composition when she was seven years old titled " Thank you, Good-bye" as a farewell for her grandmother before leaving Japan.

Kajiura moved back to Japan when she was in middle school and later graduated from college. She began working as a systems engineering programming until 1992 that she decided to focus more on music.

In 2002, See-Saw participated in another Mashimo's project, .hack//Sign During the production of the series, Kajiura met Emily Bindiger and impressed by her vocals, offered her to perform over 10 of the series' insert songs. She has also jokingly called Bindiger "her English teacher" at Anime Expo 2003.

One of Kajiura's solo projects includes FictionJunction. The project involves collaboration with artists such as Yuuka Nanri, Asuka Kato, and Kaori Oda. FictionJunction Yuuka, with Nanri as the vocalist, is the most prolific of these collaborations. In 2004, the duo produced the opening and ending songs for Kōichi Mashimo's Madlax and in the next year, published their first collaborative album, Destination.

In October 2007, it was announced that Yuki Kajiura would be attending the performances of the Eminence Orchestra's concert, 'A Night in Fantasia 2007 – Symphonic Anime Edition', as a special guest.

The 2014 series Aldnoah.Zero's opening theme "Heavenly Blue" was composed by Kajiura and was performed by Kalafina.

In July 2016, Aniplex of America announced that the “Yuki Kajiura LIVE ~featuring SWORD ART ONLINE~” concert that took place in March 2016 in Japan would be having an additional date on January 14, 2017, at the Dolby Theatre in Los Angeles, California, but was later canceled due to visa issues.

In December 2017, a source reported to a news site, Sponchi Annex that Kajiura was planning to leave her agency, Spacecraft Produce, over contract disputes. In February 2018, Kajiura herself confirmed via her Twitter that she has officially left her agency.

Kajiura has performed internationally at various anime conventions including Anime Expo 2003, Anime Boston 2009 (with Kalafina), Anime Expo 2012 (with FictionJunction), and Anime Expo 2018 (as part of Anisong World Matsuri).

On February 22, 2018, her contract ended with SpaceCraft Produce after being a talent for 25 years. She is now represented by FictionJunction Music, a talent agency she founded herself.

Discography

Solo albums

Compilation albums

As project member

Produced albums

Other involvements

Works

Anime

Anime films

Video games

Television dramas

Live-action films

Musicals

References

External links

 
Yuki Kajiura discography at VGMdb

 
1965 births
Anime composers
Crunchyroll Anime Awards winners
Japanese classical composers
Japanese expatriates in Germany
Japanese film score composers
Japanese multi-instrumentalists
Japanese musical theatre composers
Japanese record producers
Japanese Buddhists
Japanese Shintoists
Japanese television composers
Japanese women anthropologists
Japanese women classical composers
Japanese women film score composers
Japanese women record producers
Living people
Musicians from Bonn
Musicians from Tokyo
Victor Entertainment artists
Video game composers
Women in classical music
Women musical theatre composers
Women television composers